The voiceless uvular fricative is a type of consonantal sound used in some spoken languages.

There is also a voiceless uvular fricative trill (a simultaneous  and ) in some languages, e.g. Hebrew and Wolof as well as in the northern and central varieties of European Spanish. A plain fricative that is articulated slightly further front, as either medio-velar or post-palatal is typical of dialects spoken south of the rivers (mainly Brabantian and Limburgish), including Belgian SD. In those dialects, the voiceless uvular fricative trill is one of the possible realizations of the phoneme . In fact, more languages claimed to have a voiceless uvular fricative may actually have a fricative trill.  note that there is "a complication in the case of uvular fricatives in that the shape of the vocal tract may be such that the uvula vibrates."

The frication in the fricative trill variant sometimes occurs at the middle or the back of the soft palate (termed velar or mediovelar and post-velar, respectively), rather than the uvula itself. This is the case in Northern Standard Dutch as well as some varieties of Arabic, Limburgish and Madrid Spanish. It may thus be appropriate to call those variants voiceless (post)velar-uvular fricative trill as the trill component is always uvular (velar trills are not physically possible).

For a voiceless pre-uvular fricative (also called post-velar), see voiceless velar fricative.

Features 
Features of the voiceless uvular fricative:

Occurrence

See also 
 Index of phonetics articles
 Voiced uvular fricative

Notes

References

External links
 

Fricative consonants
Uvular consonants
Pulmonic consonants
Voiceless oral consonants
Central consonants